Hans Olson (born July 3, 1952), is an American musician and songwriter. He is a singer and plays an amplified acoustic guitar and a harmonica in a neck rack. He is known as one of the best "harp-in-a-rack" players in the world. Olson helped to establish and organize the Phoenix Blues Society (1988), the Arizona Green Party (1991), the Arizona Blues Hall of Fame (1995), the Arizona Music Heritage Foundation and the Arizona Music and Entertainment Hall of Fame (2002). In 1996, Olson was inducted into the Arizona Blues Hall of Fame. Both Phoenix Magazine and Phoenix New Times named Olson as one of the most influential musicians in Arizona.

Musical style and influences 
Olson usually performs solo, although he has played with many bands throughout his career. Olson combines a blend of blues, country, folk music and original songs. Olson has played with bands and artists such as The Allman Brothers, Tom Waits, ZZ Top, B.B. King, Muddy Waters, Allison Kraus, Chuck Berry, Bonnie Raitt, Joe Cocker, and John Fogerty. His early inspirations were Johnny Cash, Bob Dylan, The Rolling Stones, and Muddy Waters. He is currently endorsed by Lee Oskar harmonicas.

Biography

Early years 
Olson was born in San Bernardino, California in 1952. At the age of five, his cousin threw an errant arrow which resulted in the loss of his eye. Olson's father died the same year. At the age of six, he watched Gene Kelly dance on TV and decided he wanted to be in show business. At the age of nine, Olson heard the music of Johnny Cash and decided he wanted to become a musician. He began playing music at the age of 12 and by 13, Olson was playing gigs, which offered the opportunity to be away from his alcoholic stepfather. In his early teens, Olson became depressed and began drinking alcohol and using drugs.

Teenage years 
In 1967, Olson began his music career in San Bernardino, California as a lead singer in a Rock & Roll band. He also began performing solo gigs in coffee shops. As a stunt, he used to carry around a switch blade and cut his hand to "freak people out". On one occasion he was too intoxicated to realize he was holding a serrated steak knife, and he ended up cutting too deep and temporarily lost all movement in his left hand.  Due to his injury and limited mobility, Olson started to play the harmonica because it only required the use of one hand. When his left hand eventually healed, he began to practice what became his trademark skill of playing the harmonica and the guitar at the same time.

In 1969, when he was 17 years old, Olson was disturbed by the news of Charles Manson's murder spree and the violence at the Altamont Speedway Free Festival, and decided to move away from California. He moved to Arizona to complete his high school degree and pursue his music career.

Music career 
In 1971, Olson was hired to perform radio commercials for Kirk's Electronics in Tempe, Arizona. Over the years he recorded several station identification ads for Phoenix, Arizona area radio stations.

In 1973, Olson was the opening act for The Allman Brothers and Boz Skaggs, with more than 22,000 people in attendance. The same year, he recorded his first album, Western Winds with Phoenix label, Joplin Records. In 2012, on the 100th anniversary of Arizona's statehood, the title song from this album was listed in the Phoenix New Times magazine as one of Arizona's 100 greatest songs.

In 1980, he toured coast to coast with Dave Mason; they played over 100 shows together. The same year, his album, Hans Olson Sings the Blues, reached No. 3 on the local Tower Records sales chart.

In 1981, he recorded his album The Aspen Tapes with session musicians, Al Kooper, Albert Lee, and Mark Naftalin and produced by William E. McEuen, the manager and producer for the Nitty Gritty Dirt Band.

In 1982, Olson toured with Brownie McGhee, playing harmonica and guitar. This same year, Tom Fogerty recorded one of Olson's songs as the title track on his Fantasy Records release album, Deal it Out.

In the mid 1980s Olson was part of the quartet, Hans Olson and the Rhythm Masters.

In 1986 Olson helped found the Sun Club, a former hub of the Tempe music scene. The Sun Club was fundamental in launching the careers of acts such as Dead Hot Workshop and the Gin Blossoms. After a few years, Olson filed for bankruptcy, and in 1992, the Sun Club closed.

In 1988, Olson helped to establish and organize the Phoenix Blues Society.

In 1990, Olson sang the opening and closing theme for the Burt Reynold's television series, Evening Shade.

In 1991, he helped establish the Arizona Green Party.

In 1992, he toured as Michelle Shocked's opening act, and headlined a 40 day European tour, performing in France, Germany and Austria. Phoenix radio station, KZON, used his song "You Wish" to launch its programming.

In 1993, he performed at the Peer Rhythm and Blues Festival in Belgium along with Albert Collins, Delbert McClinton, The Five Blind Boys of Alabama, CJ Chenier, and The Jeff Healey Band. He also performed at the Free Wheels Festival in France. He won "Best Solo Act" of the year at the Arizona Entertainment Awards show. He also won "Best Solo Act" of the year in the Phoenix New Times Weekly, reader's choice awards. Several of his songs were played on the Time Warner mini-series "The Wild West."

In 1995, Olson helped create the Arizona Blues Hall of Fame.

In 2000, he created the Sun Club Records label.

In 2002, he helped found the Arizona Music and Entertainment Hall of Fame.

In 2006, Olson signed with Fervor Records and has produced three full length albums and a music video for the label. Fervor also controls a vast majority of the Hans Olson back catalog.

Legacy 
Olson continues to perform and owns a recording studio in Arizona. His music has been placed in various TV shows, films, advertisements, and soundtracks for motion pictures.

Olson's music has been released on many different record labels, including Virgin Records in Europe, Fervor Records in Phoenix, Arizona, and his own label, Sun Club Records.

Discography

TV and film credits 

His work can also be heard in the following shows:
Cold Case
George Lopez
Ghost Whisperer
Criminal Minds
It's Always Sunny in Philadelphia
Braving Alaska (National Geographic)
The Wild West (Time-Life/Warner Bros. mini-series)
The Music of the Wild West (TNN)
Man Outside (Virgin Vision Films)
Mill Ave., Inc. (Independent film)

On tour 
Olson has toured, performed, been an opening act for, and/or recorded with the following musicians (and others):
Michelle Shocked
Tom Waits
Brownie McGhee
Al Kooper
Albert Lee
Dallas Taylor
Boz Scaggs
Dave Mason
Allman Brothers Band
Arlo Guthrie
Bonnie Raitt
Albert Collins
John Hammond
Jeff Healey
Five Blind Boys of Alabama
Nitty Gritty Dirt Band
Elvin Bishop
Joe Cocker
Gatemouth Brown
Paul Butterfield
Canned Heat
John Fogerty
Johnny Winter
Edgar Winter
Tony Martinez Band
Stevie Ray Vaughan
Willie Dixon
John Lee Hooker
B.B. King
Muddy Waters
Upsuck

References

External links

Official website
Phoenixnewtimes.com

1952 births
Living people
Musicians from San Bernardino, California
American folk musicians
American blues guitarists
American male guitarists
American blues harmonica players
American country singer-songwriters
Singer-songwriters from California
Guitarists from Arizona
Guitarists from California
20th-century American guitarists
Harmonica blues musicians
Country musicians from California
Country musicians from Arizona
20th-century American male musicians
American male singer-songwriters
Singer-songwriters from Arizona